Beveren is a railway station in the town of Beveren, East Flanders, Belgium. The station opened on 3 November 1844 and is located on line 59. The train services are operated by National Railway Company of Belgium (NMBS).

Train services
The station is served by the following services:

Intercity services (IC-02) Ostend - Bruges - Ghent - Sint-Niklaas - Antwerpen

See also
 List of railway stations in Belgium

References

External links
 
 Beveren railway station at Belgian Railways website

Railway stations in Belgium
Railway stations in East Flanders
Railway stations in Belgium opened in 1844
Beveren